Sorond or Sarand may refer to:
 Sarand, East Azerbaijan
 Sarand, Boshruyeh, South Khorasan Province
 Sarand, Ferdows, South Khorasan Province
 Sorond, Tabas, South Khorasan Province